East Mount Lowther is a hill in the Lowther Hills range, part of the Southern Uplands of Scotland. The hill is most often climbed as a detour before or after ascending Lowther Hill, however much longer approaches from the south utilising ancient pathways such as the medieval Enterkin Pass are also possible - a viewpoint indicator is located at the summit.

References

Mountains and hills of the Southern Uplands
Mountains and hills of Dumfries and Galloway
Donald mountains